The Coastal Carolina–Liberty football rivalry is an American college football rivalry between the Coastal Carolina Chanticleers football team of Coastal Carolina University and Liberty Flames football team of Liberty University.

Notable Dates

2002-2003
The two teams met  for the first time in Lynchburg, VA at the home of Liberty University.  This was the first year that Coastal Carolina fielded a football team.  Liberty was in their second year in a FCS conference.  At least a share of the conference title was won by one of the two schools nine times between the years 2004 – 2014 (2011 was won by Stony Brook outright).  They shared the title 2010, 2012–2014.

2014
With Coastal leading the series by one game, Liberty was looking to even it up on the road. Liberty blocked what could have been a winning field goal for Coastal. This win against a previously undefeated, FCS ranked team on the road clinched Liberty's first bid to a FCS playoff.

2015
The two teams met on a Thursday night in Lynchburg, VA, where the game was showcased on ESPNEWS, marking the first time the matchup was featured on a main ESPN network. This game featured a series of back-and-forth scoring, with the Flames ultimately pulling out the victory on a 40-yard TD pass from Josh Woodrum to B.J. Farrow with 1:27 left in the game. Liberty Flames fans rushed the field after the game.

2016
In their first year as a FCS independent school, the Chanticleers kept a few of their former conference foes on the schedule.  The Flames last game of the regular season was played South Carolina, as the Flames suffered their worst loss (35pts) in this rivalry.

2020
Due to the COVID-19 Pandemic, many teams had games cancelled.  The Chanticleers and Flames were to meet up for a game on December 5 in South Carolina reviving a rivalry, as both had holes in their schedules. 
 Including from this game, the schools are scheduled to play each other five times between 2023 and 2030. ESPN was scheduled to broadcast College GameDay between the 25th ranked and one loss Flames against the undefeated 14th ranked Chanticleers.  This was to be the first meeting between these former FCS conference foes as FBS teams.
A few days before the game, Liberty had to back out due to COVID-19 issues with their team.  This allowed BYU to fill the slot matching two undefeated teams in what was called by some Mormons vs. Mullets.

The two teams did finally get to meet a few weeks later in the 2020 edition of the Cure Bowl.   This was the first time the Chanticleers were in an FBS bowl game.  This was the second straight year for the Flames.  The Chanticleers head coach stated that the importance of the game “means more than the Sun Belt Championship to a lot of people”   The Flame were able to prevent the Chanticleers from having an undefeated season by blocking a field goal that would have sent the game into double overtime.

Game results

See also 
 List of NCAA college football rivalry games

References 

Coastal Carolina Chanticleers football
Liberty Flames football
College football rivalries in the United States